The following outline is provided as an overview of and topical guide to photography:

Photography – process of making pictures by the action of recording light patterns, reflected or emitted from objects, on a photosensitive medium or an image sensor through a timed exposure. The process is done through mechanical, chemical, or electronic devices known as cameras.

Areas of practice

Applied photography

Scientific photography 

 Aerial photography
 Aerial archaeology
 Astrophotography
 Autoradiography
 Cartography and photography
 Chronophotography
 Fundus photography
 Geophotography
 Phototherapy
 Pseudocolor
 Remote sensing
 Schlieren photography
 Scientific visualization
 Visual anthropology

Scientific imaging 

 Acoustic holography
 Dark-field microscopy
 Electron microscope
 False-color
 High-speed photography
 Holography
 Kirlian photography
 Photogrammetry
 Photomicrography
 Multispectral imaging
Ultraviolet photography
Infrared photography
Full-spectrum photography

Medical imaging 

Creating images of the human body or parts of it, to diagnose or examine disease.
 Bioluminescence imaging – a technique for studying laboratory animals using luminescent protein.
 Calcium imaging – determining the calcium status of a tissue using fluorescent light.
 Diffuse optical imaging – using near-infrared light to generate images of the body.
 Diffusion-weighted imaging – a type of MRI that uses water diffusion.
 Endoscopy – a procedure using an endoscope to examine the interior of a hollow organ or cavity of the body.
 Fluorescence lifetime imaging – using the decay rate of a fluorescent sample.
Fluorescence image-guided surgery – used to detect fluorescently labelled structures during surgery.
 Gallium imaging – a nuclear medicine method for the detection of infections and cancers.
 Imaging agent – a chemical designed to allow clinicians to determine whether a mass is benign or malignant.
 Imaging studies – which includes many medical imaging techniques.
 Magnetic resonance imaging (MRI) – a non-invasive method to render images of living tissues.
 Microscopy – creating images of objects or features too small to be detectable by the naked human eye.
 Molecular imaging – used to study molecular pathways inside organisms.
 Non-contact thermography – is the field of thermography that derives diagnostic indications from infrared images of the human body.
 Nuclear medicine – uses administered radioactive substances to create images of internal organs and their function.
 Optical imaging – using light as an investigational tool for biological research and medical diagnosis.
 Optoacoustic imaging – using the photothermal effect, for the accuracy of spectroscopy with the depth resolution of ultrasound.
 Photoacoustic Imaging – a technique to detect vascular disease and cancer using non-ionizing laser pulses.
 Ultrasound imaging – using very high frequency sound to visualize muscles and internal organs.

Commercial photography 

 Celebrity photography
 Concert photography
 Fashion photography
 Food photography
 Freelance photography
 Head shot
 Industrial photography
 Kodak girl
 Sports photography
 Stock photography
 Wedding photography
 Yearbook
 "You press the button, we do the rest"

Police and military photography 

 Forensic photography
 Mug shot
 War photography

Social dimensions of photography 

Conservation and restoration of photographs
 Visual anthropology
 Vernacular photography
Selfie

Photojournalism 

 Documentary photography
 Life (magazine)
List of photojournalists
 Narrative photography
 Paparazzi
 Photo-essay
 Social documentary photography
 Social photography
 War photography

Political dimensions of photography 

 Agitprop
 Censorship
 Conservation photography
List of photographers of the civil rights movement
 Propaganda

Photography and desire 

 Erotic photography
 Fashion photography
 Glamour photography
List of BDSM photographers
 Nude photography
 Pin-up model
 Pornography

Subjects, styles, and formats

Photographic subjects 

 Architectural photography
 Fireworks photography
 Nature photography
 Cloudscape photography
 Conservation photography
 Landscape photography
 Underwater photography
 Wildlife photography
 Night photography
 Portrait photography
 Street photography
 Subminiature photography

Photographic styles 

 Abstract photography
 Candid photography
 Environmental portrait
 Low-key photography
 Old-time photography
 Snapshot
 Still life
 Straight photography

Photographic formats 
See also: Scientific imaging

Black and white
Color photography
Chemigram
Chemogram
Digital photography
Lo-fi photography
Lomography
Monochrome photography
Panoramic photography
Photogram
Stereoscopic photography
Virtual reality
Xerography

Art and theory

Art and photography 

 Abstraction
 American Realism
 Appropriation
 Art
 Artists books
 Conceptual photography
 Modernism
 Exhibitions
 The Family of Man
 Festivals

Theory 

 Aesthetics
 Art criticism
 Conceptual photography
 Constructed reality
 Decisive moment
 Deconstruction
 Ideology
 Memory
 Truth
 Representation
 Semiotics
 Social representation
 Time and space
 Visual anthropology
 Voyeurism

Photographic technology

See also: History of photographic technology

 Cabinet photograph
Color photography
 Digital photography
 Digiscoping
 Microphotography
 Photogenic drawings
 Photometry
 Stereoscope

Image capture 

 Bracketing
 Burst mode
 Exposure
 Time-lapse photography

Camera

Types of camera 

 Box camera
 Brownie camera
 Camera obscura
 Camera phone
 Digital single-lens reflex camera
 Diana camera
 Digital camera
Zebra patterning
 Disposable camera
 Field camera
 Instant or polaroid camera
 Pinhole camera
 Point and shoot camera
 Press camera
 Rangefinder camera
 Single-lens reflex camera
 Three-CCD camera
 Twin-lens reflex camera
 Toy camera
 View camera

Parts of a camera 

 Camera back
 Shutter
 Hotshoe
 Aperture
 Viewfinder

Lens 

 Fisheye lens
 Lens
 Lens hood
 Perspective control lens
 Telecentric lens
 Telephoto lens
 Wide-angle lens
 Zoom lens

Accessories 

 Cable release
 Filter
 Monopod
 Tripod

Film 

35 mm
Anti-halation backing
 Film base
 Film developing
 Film format
 Film holder
 Film speed
Sensitometry
 Film stock
Grain
 Photographic plate
 Infrared film
 Instant film
 Negative
 Reversal film

Lighting 

 Beauty dish
 Fill light
 Flash
Flash synchronization
Red-eye effect
 Gobo
Guide number
 Key light
 Light meter
 Monolight
 Reflector
 Snoot
 Softbox

Projection

Photographic effects 

Bokeh
Contre-jour
 Motion blur

Photographic processing

 Airgraph
 Bas-relief
 Color
 Darkroom
 Developer
 Dufaycolor
 Dye coupler
 Enlarger
 Fixer
 Hand-coloring of photographs
Photographic print toning
 Heliograph
 Image stabilization
 Instant photography
 Lomography
 Minilab
 Orthochromatic
 Photosculpture
 Photographic printing
 Safelight
 Solarization
 Stop bath

Digital processing 

 Adobe Photoshop
 Digital printing
 High-dynamic-range imaging (HDR)
 Image histogram
 Scanning
 Film scanner
 Unsharp masking

Processes 

Alternative process
 Bleach bypass
 Bromoil process
 Cross processing
 Cyanotype
 Double exposure
 Gum bichromate
 Infrared
 Oil print process
 Pinhole
 Platinum process
 Polaroid art
 Redscale
 Sprocket hole
 Through the Viewfinder
 C-41 process
 Collodion process
 Contact printing
 Dodging and burning
 Dye transfer process
 E-6 process
 Gelatin silver process
 Half-tone process
 K-14 process
 Lippmann process
 Printing
 Process camera
 Push printing
 Push processing
 Sun printing
 Wet collodion process

Papers, prints, and -types 

 Anthotype
 Blotting paper
 Bromide paper
 Calotype
 Carbro
 Chromogenic print
 Chrysotype
Cyanotype
 Contact print
 Gum printing
 Hillotype
 Hyalotype
 Kallitype
 Litmus paper
 Melainotype
 Paper negative
 Physautotype
 Print permanence
 Photograph
 Woodburytype

Photographic techniques

 Afocal photography 
 Chemigram
 Chemogram
 Harris shutter 
 Kinetic photography
 Kite aerial photography 
 Light painting 
 Macro photography 
 Miniature faking
 Panning 
 Photogram 
 Rephotography 
 Rollout photography 
 Solarisation 
 Stereoscopy 
 Stopping down 
 Tilt–shift photography
 Time-lapse photography

Photographic concepts 

Composition 
Rule of thirds
Field of view
Headroom
Perspective (visual)
Lead room
Framing
Golden triangle (composition)
 Density
Callier effect
Characteristic curve
Contrast
Reciprocity
Exposure
Shutter speed
Aperture
F-number
Exposure compensation
Exposure value
Exposure latitude
Zone system
Metering mode
Time exposure
Moire patterns

Optics 

Angle of view
Chromatic aberration
Field of view
Focus
Autofocus
Depth of field
Depth of focus
Hyperfocal distance
Soft focus
Distortion
Electromagnetic spectrum
Fourier optics
Flare

Focal length
35mm equivalent focal length

Gaussian optics
Newton's rings

Orb (optics)
Optical transfer function
Optical aberration

Perspective
Perspective distortion
Polarized light
Vignetting

Color 

CMYK color model
Color balance
Color management
Color photography
Color space
Color temperature
Colorimetry
Primary color
RGB color model

Digital imaging 

Image Compression
Gaussian blur
Image histogram
Histogram equalization
Image scaling
Logarithms

Noise
Pixel
Posterization

Digital image formats 

 DNG
 GIF
 JPEG
 PNG
 RAW
 TIFF

Photography organizations 

Farm Security Administration
Missions Héliographiques
National Geographic
Royal Photographic Society
Société française de photographie

Photographic equipment makers 

 Canon
 Fujifilm
 Hasselblad
 Ilford
 Kodak
 Leica
 Minolta
 Nikon
 Pentax
 Polaroid

Museums and libraries 
Museums and libraries with significant photography collections.

Center for Creative Photography
Family of Man Museum, Clervaux Castle, Luxembourg
George Eastman Museum
Getty Museum
Instituto Moreira Salles
International Center of Photography
International Photography Hall of Fame and Museum
Library of Congress
Metropolitan Museum of Art
Musée d'Orsay
Museo de Arte de Lima
Museum of Contemporary Photography Chicago
Museum of Fine Arts, Houston
Museum of Jewish Heritage
Museum of Modern Art
National Gallery of Art, Washington DC
National Portrait Gallery UK
National Portrait Gallery US
Niepce Museum
New York Public Library
Smithsonian American Art Museum
Tate Galleries

Photographers 

 Women photographers

 List of photographers

 List of women photographers
List of Jewish American photographers
List of street photographers
Photography by indigenous peoples of the Americas

Photographers by nationality 

 List of Bangladeshi photographers
 List of Chinese photographers
 List of German photographers
 List of Greek photographers
 List of Korean photographers
 List of New Zealand women photographers
 List of Norwegian photographers
 List of Polish photographers
 List of Slovenian photographers
 List of Turkish photographers

History of photography

History of photographic technology 

History of the camera
Camera obscura

Pioneers and inventors of photographic technology 

Hippolyte Bayard
Louis Daguerre
George Eastman
Sergey Prokudin-Gorsky
John Herschel
Eadweard Muybridge
Nicéphore Niépce
William Fox Talbot
Thomas Wedgwood

Historic photographic processes 

 Ambrotype
 Autochrome Lumière
 Calotype
 Collodion process
 Cyanotype
 Daguerreotype
 Dufaycolor
 Heliography
 Platinum print
 Salt print
 Tintype

History of photography in culture and art 

 Bauhaus
 Cliche-verre
 Dada
 Decisive moment
 Farm Security Administration
 Formalism
 Fotoform
 Futurism
 Gallery 291
 Group f.64
 Harlem Renaissance
 Impressionism
 The Linked Ring
 Modernism
 Neorealism
 Neue Sachlichkeit
 Neues Sehen / New Vision
 New Documents
 New Topographics
 Orientalism
 Photo-Secession
 Photomontage
 Pictorialism
 Pop art
 Postmodernism
 Realism
 Socialist realism
 Straight photography
 Surrealism
 Vortograph
 Wiener Aktionismus / Viennese Actionism

Lists 

 List of most expensive photographs

External links

 Judging the authenticity of Photographs: 1800s to Today Guide for collectors and historians
 Rarities of the USSR photochronicles Pioneers of Soviet Photography.
    "Every Picture Has a Story" - uses pictures from the Smithsonian's collections to show the development of the technology through the nineteenth century.
 Shades of Light  (Australian Photography 1839 - 1988) the online version of the original Shades of Light published 1998, Gael Newton, National Gallery of Australia.
 Illustrated Photography - Basic Photography - The basics of photography explained in a series of articles.
 Camera Obscura - digital library on the history photographic techniques

Outline
Photography
Photography
Photography
Photography
 1
Science of photography